Robert Maxwell (June 17, 1858 – August 23, 1914) was a Canadian politician. He served in the Legislative Assembly of New Brunswick from 1905 to 1912 as an independent member.

References 

1858 births
1914 deaths
Independent New Brunswick MLAs
Politicians from Fredericton